Huazhou or Hua Prefecture was a zhou (prefecture) in imperial China in modern southwestern Guangdong, China. It existed from 980 to 1912.

The modern county-level city Huazhou, Guangdong retains its name.

Counties
Hua Prefecture administered the following counties during the Song dynasty:
Shilong, modern Huazhou, Guangdong.
Wuchuan, modern Wuchuan, Guangdong.
Shicheng, modern Lianjiang, Guangdong.

References

 
 

Guangnan West Circuit
Prefectures of the Yuan dynasty
Prefectures of the Ming dynasty
Prefectures of the Qing dynasty
Former prefectures in Guangdong
980 establishments
10th-century establishments in China
1912 disestablishments in China
Zhanjiang